Figure skating at the 2005 European Youth Olympic Winter Festival took place in Monthey, Switzerland between January 22 and 29, 2005. Skaters competed in the disciplines of men's singles and ladies' singles.

Results

Men

Ladies

External links
 results

European Youth Olympic Festival
Figure skating
International figure skating competitions hosted by Switzerland
2005 European Youth Summer Olympic Festival